David James Palm (born 7 July 1958) is a former Australian rules footballer who played with Richmond in the Victorian Football League (VFL) during the 1980s.

Palm played at both Norwood and West Perth before joining Francis Bourke's Richmond in 1983. A tough and aggressive defender, he appeared in all possible 22 games in his debut season. Against Essendon at the MCG in 1985 he kicked five goals and in 1987 he had perhaps his best season, averaging 16 disposals a game.

In 1989, Palm left Richmond for Springvale and was selected to represent the VFA at interstate football that year. He also served as Springvale's assistant coach.

References

External links
 
 
 David Palm's playing statistics from The VFA Project

1958 births
Richmond Football Club players
West Perth Football Club players
Norwood Football Club players
Casey Demons players
Living people
Australian rules footballers from Western Australia